Aman Kekilov (Аман Кекилов; Keshi village, current Ahal Province, 9 May 1912 – 13 December 1974) was a Soviet Turkmen poet. Among his relations was the writer and dissident Annasoltan Kekilova.

References

1912 births
1974 deaths
People from Ahal Region
Soviet male poets
20th-century male writers
Ethnic Turkmen poets
Turkmenistan male poets
Turkmenistan poets
20th-century Turkmenistan writers